Nikola Popović may refer to:

 Nikola Popović (footballer) (born 1994), Serbian footballer
 Nikola Popović (football coach) (born 1978), Portuguese/Serbian football coach
 Nikola Popović (basketball) (born 1997), Serbian basketball player